Christopher Sequeira (also published as Chris G.C. Sequeira, Christopher G.C. Sequeira, C.G.C. Sequeira) is a Sydney-based Australian editor, writer and artist who works predominantly in the speculative fiction (horror, fantasy, science fiction, super-hero) and mystery realms. His published work includes poetry, prose (especially short fiction), and comic-book scripts. Sequeira's creator-owned work includes "Sherlock Holmes: Dark Detective" (with co-creators Dave Elsey and Philip Cornell),  Pulse of Darkness, Rattlebone: The Pulp-Faced Detective and The Borderlander.

He has also written for American publishers, notably contributing a Dazzler story, "I'm Gonna Stake You, Sucka" in X-Men: Curse of the Mutants – X-Men vs. Vampires No. 1. This story also features a character, Sheba Sugarfangs, invented by Sequeira for Marvel Comics.

In 2010, Sequeira released Pulse of Darkness: The Vampire Syndrome graphic novel, a 140-page graphic novel illustrated by Kurt Stone, and also featuring inkers and pin-up artists representing some of Australia's best, including Mark Morte, Bryce J. Stevens, David 'Hyperdave' Richardson, Ashley Riddell, Gary Chaloner, W. Chew 'Chewie' Chan, Paul Abstruse, and Jan Scherpenhuizen.

He has self-published and published the works of others under the imprints of Opal Press Australia and Sequence Productions Pty Ltd. Sequeira has been a regular guest at comics and pop culture expos in Australia including Supanova Pop Culture Expo and Armageddon.

Sequeira's wedding ceremony in 1999 was covered on Australian national TV due to the celebrant and bridal party being dressed in costume, including Dracula, and Batman villains Penguin, Two-Face and Riddler. Sequeira lives with his wife and two children in Sydney.

Award nominations

Works edited
 Tides of Hope. A one-shot graphic novel collection in support of the relief appeal for victims of the 2010 Queensland floods.
 Terror Australis magazine (1987–92). Co-edited with Leigh Blackmore and Bryce J. Stevens. Sequeira coined the magazine's title and was also Art Editor the magazine. 
 Groves, Peter. Fruit from the Primeval Groves. Sydney: Sequence Productions, 1997. Verse.

Fiction, art, verse, non-fiction
Sequeira's prose short stories and art have appeared in many publications including Bloodsongs, Eddie, Phantastique,  Terror Australis: Best Australian Horror and The Australian H.P. Lovecraft Centenary Calendar (1990).

His story "Too Many Number Sixteens" appears in Midnight Echo 5 (Feb 2011), published by the Australian Horror Writers Association. For Holmesian fiction, see below.

His verse and non-fiction have appeared in Shoggoth and Terror Australis, and Sequeira also provided an introduction to the short story collection Skin Tight (1995) by fellow horror writer Bryce J. Stevens.

Holmesian work

Sequeira has contributed many essays and articles on Holmesian matters to the journal of the Sydney Passengers Sherlock Holmes Society, Passengers' Log. One of these, "No Stranger to the Knife: Sherlock Holmes Vs Jack the Ripper", has been praised by eminent Sherlock Holmes scholar Leslie S. Klinger as "a brilliant paper" in his Return of Sherlock Holmes (Sherlock Holmes Reference Library)(Oxford University Press, 2003).

Sequeira sold three Sherlockian prose stories to anthologies appearing in 2008. "His Last Arrow" in Charles Prepolec (ed) Gaslight Grimoire: Fantastic Tales of Sherlock Holmes (Edge Publishing) was nominated for a WSFA Small Press Award in 2009. Two other Holmesian stories – "The Return of the Sussex Vampire" and "The Adventure of the Haunted Showman" – appeared in David Stuart Davies (ed) Sherlock Holmes: The Game's Afoot! (Wordsworth).   "The Adventure of the Haunted Showman" was also reprinted in The Dark Detective Sherlock Holmes Issue 6 (Dec 2010).
 
Sherlock Holmes: The Crossovers Casebook (Moonstone Publishing, 2012) features two Holmesian prose stories by Sequeira – "The Scion of Fear" and "The Adventure of the Lost Specialist".

Radio
Sequeira briefly hosted a radio show, The Darkness Before the Dawn on 2RRR-FM in Sydney.(1986)

Films
Sequeira has directed two independent short films, "Curse of the Bloodsuckers", and "Rattlebone" (the latter based on his comic-book Rattlebone character).

Comics written and published
Sequeira contributed the comic-book story "Unearthing the Facts" in Kagamono: Flowers and Skulls (horror comic anthology from Black Glass Press, 2011), illustrated by David 'Hyperdave' Richardson.

His graphic story "The Catamorph" featuring the eponymous hero created with Jan Scherpenhuizen appeared in Terra Magazine No 1 (Black House Comics, 2012) with art by Scherpenhuizen and Michal Dutkiewicz.

In 2011, following the devastating 2010-2011 Queensland floods, Sequeira initiated and edited a comics project to raise funds for the Queensland Flood Relief Appeal. While the project was Sequeira's brainchild, Tim McEwen assisted with art directing, co-editing and commissioning. The one-shot anthology Tides of Hope featured stories and art by many Australian and international writers and artists, all of whom donated their work at no cost.  Printing was funded by Supanova Pop Culture Expo. Sales of the comic raised $10,000, of which 100% was donated in support of the flood relief charity. Sequeira's story "Falling" (with art by Leinil Francis Yu) was included in the comic. . The line-up of writers and artists in the comic included Liz Argyll, Paul Bedford, Bernard Caleo, Greg Capullo, Gary Chaloner, W. Chew 'Chewie' Chan, Jason Chatfield, Chris Claremont, Rebecca Clements, Jeff Cruz, Julie Ditrich, Sarah Ellerton, Dave Elsey, Anton Emdin, Michael Evans, David Follett, Robert Forrest, Jason Franks, Doug Holgate, Paul Jenkins, Alex Major, Alex Maleev, Paul Mason, Tim McEwen, Stewart McKenny, Jessica McLeod, Michael Michalandos, Mandy Ord, Jason Paulos, Jan Scherpenhuizen, Mark Sexton, Jon Sommariva, Steve Stamadiadis, Kurt Stone, Komala Surman, Arthur Suydam, Jozef Szekeres, Tom Taylor, Ben Templesmith, Andie Tong, Daren White, and Colin Wilson (comics).
 
Sequeira's graphic story "I'm Gonna Stake You, Sucka" (with art by Sana Takeda) appears in X-Men: Curse of the Mutants: X-Men vs Vampires No 1 (2010) (Marvel Comics).

Sequeira's Iron Man story "Making an Appearance" (with art by W. Chew 'Chewie' Chan) appears in Astonishing Tales No 1 (2009) (Marvel Comics).

Sequeira's scripts have appeared in the DC Comics titles Justice League Adventures ("Cold War", Issue 12 & "Venomous Agenda", Issue 23), and 9/11: Artists Respond ("Tall Buildings").

His graphic Cthulhu Mythos story "Incorporation" appears in Cthulhu Tales No 11 (Boom! Studios).

In June 2009 Sequeira launched a new bimonthly Sherlock Holmes comic, Sherlock Holmes: Dark Detective  published by Australia's Black House Comics. . The comic is produced in collaboration with makeup artist Dave Elsey, who won the Academy Award with Rick Baker for makeup on The Wolfman (see 83rd Academy Awards)Academy Award for Best Makeup, Phillip Cornell and Jan Scherpenhuizen. Academy Award-winning makeup artist Rick Baker asked to be the model for Professor Moriarty; Sequeira, Elsey and Cornell happily obliged and he is listed as a 'Stalwart Companion' in each issue's credits. Issue 7 appeared in 2011 and was followed by "The Dark Detective: Sherlock Holmes – Chimera", a trade paperback omnibus of the comic's first four issues with additional material on the genesis of the series by Sequeira, and additional sketches by Philip Cornell.

"Deadlocke and Doc Martin: Occult Investigators", a graphic story written by Sequeira and featuring real photography taken by him appeared in Too Much Red Cordial Issue 2 (Sydney University, 1995). A revised version appeared in Bold Action. Leigh Blackmore features as Deadlocke and Bryce J. Stevens as Doc Martin.

Comic/graphic novel productions under the Opal Press and Sequence Productions imprint:
 Pulse of Darkness. Reissued in collected form as Pulse of Darkness: The Vampire Syndrome (Cult Fiction Comics Australia, 2010).
 Rattlebone: The Pulp-Faced Detective
 Bold Action' partly co-written with Leigh Blackmore, 'with art by Jan Scherpenhuizen, Neil Walpole, the team of Igor Spajic and Kurt Stone, 
 Mister Blood co-created and with art by Jan Scherpenhuizen
 Jonny Flathead: Psychotronic Werewolf art by Gavin O'Keefe
 Dig This! The Borderlander co-written with co-creator Steve Proposch and with art by co-creator W Chew Chan
 The Glowing Man/Lyrebird. Issue One was a flip-comic with "The Glowing Man" on one side and "Lyrebird on the other. Created by Sequeira with W. Chew Chan and Jan Scherpenhuizen.

Forthcoming works include a contribution to the Avenger anthology for Moonstone Books The Avenger: Roaring Heart of the Crucible.
As editor

References

Bibliography
 Mike Ashley & William G. Contento. The Supernatural Index: A Listing of Fantasy, Supernatural, Occult, Weird and Horror Anthologies. Westport, CT: Greenwood Press, 1995, p. 500.
 Paul Collins, ed. The MUP Encyclopedia of Australian Science Fiction and Fantasy. Melbourne, Vic: Melbourne University Press, 1998, p. 46.
 Leslie S. Klinger The Annotated Sherlock Holmes. NY: W.W. Norton, 2004.
 Shiell, Annette. Bonzer: Australian Comics 1900s–1990s. Redhill, Vic: Elgua Media, 1998, pp. 96, 99.
 Bryce J. Stevens (ed). The Fear Codex: The Australian Encyclopedia of Fantasy & Horror''. Jacobyte Books, 2001 (CD-ROM).
 David Carroll Tabula Rasa http://www.tabula-rasa.info/AusComics/SequenceReview.html

External links

Living people
Australian comics writers
Australian horror writers
Writers from Sydney
Year of birth missing (living people)